Soleil Anastasia Sorge (born 5 July 1994 in Los Angeles, California) is an American naturalized Italian model, television presenter, television personality, showgirl and columnist of American origins by her mother and Italian by her father.

Biography 
Soleil Sorge was born on July 5, 1994 in Los Angeles, California (United States), to the American yoga teacher Wendy Kay and the Italian entrepreneur Paolo Sorge. From the age of three, after the separation of her parents, she spent her childhood and adolescence between Avezzano (in Abruzzo) and Los Angeles.

Career 
Soleil Sorge settled in Avezzano with her father during her childhood, after living in Los Angeles until the age of six. During her stay in Avezzano she attended the scientific high school and then moved for a while, after the scientific high school diploma, to her mother in Los Angeles to fulfill her dream of becoming an actress. Shortly after, she moved to Rome, where she enrolled in the faculty of economics of the Sapienza University of Rome, without however giving up her television career.

She started working on some programs broadcast on Roman broadcasters such as Roma TV in collaboration with NBC and in 2015 she hosted the Roma Now program. Years later she moved to New York City to study acting at Lee Strasberg Theatre and Film Institute in Manhattan.

On September 14, 2014 she participated in the Miss Italia beauty contest, broadcast on La7 and hosted by Simona Ventura, as Miss Abruzzo, ranking seventh out of twenty-six participating misses. Her notoriety came in 2016 and 2017, with the participation in Uomini e donne, broadcast on Canale 5 with the conduction of Maria De Filippi.

In 2016 she participated as an actress in the music video of Eman Il mio vizio. The following year, in 2017, she participated in the music video Mi fai innamorare with Astol.

Immediately after her participation in Uomini e donne, she began her career as a model and influencer and moved to Milan.

From 10 February 2019 to 25 March 2019 she participated in the fourteenth edition of L'isola dei famosi broadcast on Canale 5 with the conduction of Alessia Marcuzzi. She was eliminated in the tenth week during the semi-final, finishing in sixth place out of twenty-three competitors.

In 2019 and 2020 she participated in the theatrical work Doppio Misto directed and written by Danilo De Santi, at the Gold Theater in Rome.

From 11 February 2020 to 24 March 2020 she participated in the eighth edition of Pechino Express, entitled Pechino Express – Le stagioni dell'Oriente, broadcast on Rai 2 with the conduct of Costantino della Gherardesca, paired with her mother Wendy Kay, coming eliminated in the seventh episode and ranking fifth out of eleven pairs. In the same year, during the lock-down due to the COVID-19 pandemic, she left to work in the Dominican Republic, where her father Paolo lives. Also in 2020 she participated as a recurring commentator in the Pomeriggio Cinque, Domenica Live and Live – Non è la d'Urso, all programs broadcast on Canale 5 and conducted by Barbara d'Urso.

In 2020, together with Luca Vismara, she led the New Year's event Ciao, 2020 io esco, broadcast in streaming on Biccy. In 2021 you participated as a competitor in the Guess My Age – Indovina l'età, broadcast on TV8 under the direction of Enrico Papi.

From 13 September 2021 to 7 March 2022 she took part in the sixth edition of the Grande Fratello VIP broadcast on Canale 5 and hosted by Alfonso Signorini, being eliminated during the forty-seventh episode, after six months at home and a week before the final, with 42% of the votes against 58% of Davide Silvestri, ranking ninth out of thirty-eight competitors. On March 21 of the same year she participated as a commentator in the program Tiki Taka – La repubblica del pallone, broadcast on Italia 1 with the conduction of Piero Chiambretti. In April of the same year she was a victim of the Le Iene program, broadcast on Italia 1 with the conduction of Belén Rodríguez and Teo Mammucari.

From 15 March to 3 May 2022 she was chosen by Barbara d'Urso host of the fifth edition of La pupa e il secchione, entitled La pupa e il secchione Show broadcast on Italia 1, to cover the role of third judge together with Antonella Elia and Federico Fashion Style. Since May 2022 she has launched her project entitled State of Soleil, which includes a collection of bikinis and bandanas.

On June 6, 2022 she participated as a Piratessa together with Vera Gemma in the sixteenth edition of L'isola dei famosi, broadcast on Canale 5 with the conduct of Ilary Blasi. From 19 September 2022 to 3 April 2023 she leads the GF VIP Party together with Pierpaolo Pretelli on the Mediaset Infinity platform. On 27 September 2022 she participated as a competitor against Dayane Mello in the first edition of the television program broadcast on TV8 Alessandro Borghese – Celebrity Chef.

On November 15, 2022 she published her first book published by Sperling & Kupfer, Il manuale della stronza. On 26 December 2022 and 2 January 2023, together with Pierpaolo Pretelli, she replaced Sonia Bruganelli as commentator in the twenty-fifth and twenty-sixth episodes of the seventh edition of Grande Fratello VIP, under the leadership of Alfonso Signorini. On January 31, 2023 she participated as a competitor in the Millennials team together with Emanuel Caserio, Alessandro Egger and Paola Di Benedetto in the Boomerissima program, broadcast on Rai 2 with the conduction of Alessia Marcuzzi. The following day, February 1, she participated as a competitor in the game show Name That Tune - Indovina la canzone, broadcast on TV8 with the conduction of Ciro Priello and Fabio Balsamo.

In 2023 she held the role of judge in the television program Un armadio per due, broadcast on La5 with the conduction of Veronica Ruggeri. In the same year she participated as a competitor in the second edition of the television program Back to School, broadcast on Italia 1 with the conduction of Federica Panicucci.

Television programs

Web TV

Filmography

Actress

Videoclip

Theater

Works

References

External links 

 
 

1994 births
Living people
People from Los Angeles
Italian television presenters
Italian women television presenters
Italian female models
Italian twins
Twin models